Durah is a locality in the Western Downs Region, Queensland, Australia.

History 
The locality was named after a pastoral run held in the early 1850s by Thorne and Ridler who also held the adjoining Darr and Ballon runs. The name is believed to be of Aboriginal origin, meaning thigh. In an 1883 map, the Durah run appears with Durah Creek flowing through it and joining Charleys Creek to the south. It is not known whether the creek (with gully and waterhole), or the run was named first.

Fairyland West Provisional School opened on 1 May 1941, becoming Fairyland West State School on 26 April 1957. It closed in 1980. It was located on Fairyland School Road, just east of Charleys Creek (approx ). Despite the name, the school's location is now within Durah.

Education 
There are no schools in Durah. The nearest primary schools are in Burra Burri, Durong and Monogorilby. The nearest secondary schools are in Jandowae (up to Year 10) or Chinchilla (up to Year 12).

References 

Western Downs Region
Localities in Queensland